Henrike Marie Bäumer (born  7 May 1969) is a German film and TV actress. She has appeared in more than forty films since 1993. She has a son with actor Nicki von Tempelhoff.

Selected filmography

Awards
 Grimme-Preis (2011)
 Kitzbuehel Film Festival Honorary Award (2018)

References

External links

 

1969 births
Living people
Actors from Düsseldorf
German film actresses
German television actresses
20th-century German actresses
21st-century German actresses